Mark Christopher Quander (born 1974) is a United States Army brigadier general who serves as the 79th Commandant of Cadets of the United States Military Academy since May 2021. He previously served as the 98th Commandant of the United States Army Engineer School from July 2019 to May 2021 and commander of the Transatlantic Division of the United States Army Corps of Engineers from May 2018 to July 2019. He also is a member of the historic  Quander family, a family of African Americans with their ancestor having been brought to America sometime in the late 17th century. 

In February 2023, Quander was reassigned as the commanding general of the Great Lakes and Ohio River Division of the United States Army Corps of Engineers.

Education

A native of Fayetteville, North Carolina, Quander was commissioned as an engineer officer via the United States Military Academy, graduating with a B.S. degree in civil engineering. He also holds an M.S. degree in Engineering Management from the University of Missouri and an M.S. degree in Public Policy from Georgetown University.

Personal life

Quander is married to retired lieutenant colonel Melonie Quander, an Army nurse who served in the Iraq War. They have one daughter. His promotion to brigadier general in February 2020 made him the fourth member of his extended family to attain general officer rank, after his cousins Vincent Brooks, Leo Brooks Jr., and his uncle Leo Brooks Sr.

References

1974 births
Date of birth missing (living people)
Living people
Georgetown University alumni
Missouri University of Science and Technology alumni
United States Military Academy alumni
People from Fayetteville, North Carolina
Recipients of the Legion of Merit
United States Army generals
Quander family